Lucy Ann Bishop Millington (June 10, 1825 – January 17, 1900) was an American self-taught botanist known for her discovery of Arceuthobium pusillum, a species of dwarf mistletoe that was damaging trees in New York State.

Early life and education 
Born Lucy Bishop, she was the second child in a wealthy merchant family that owned several businesses in New Russia (now Elizabethtown), a town in the Adirondack region of New York. Bishop was an autodidact, though she likely attended local schools.

Career and research 
Millington had a decades-long career in botany; her first notable publication was the 1871 discovery of A. pusillum. She proceeded to publish a number of articles in popular science and contributed  extensively to herbaria in New York. Throughout her career, she corresponded and collaborated with Charles Peck. She is commemorated with the rest of her family with statues in their hometown. She functioned as a mentor to Liberty Hyde Bailey, whom she first met in 1876, when she was already established and he an eighteen-year-old student interested in botany.

References 

1825 births
1900 deaths
American women botanists
Scientists from New York (state)
19th-century American botanists
19th-century American women